The Creative Folkestone Book Festival is an annual event held in Folkestone, Kent, England. The 2021 edition is scheduled to be held 4–13 June 2021.

History 
The festival was founded as the Kent Literature Festival in 1980, before being rebadged as the Folkestone Literary Festival in 2002, when it grew in prominence under the auspices of the Creative Foundation - now Creative Folkestone.

In 2005 local people were encouraged to engage with the Festival through the formation of the Friends of the Book Festival. In 2006, Hay Festival Director, Peter Florence, was commissioned to produce a plan to further develop the Festival, which helped to attract star names including high profile participants have included Ben Okri, Alan Bennett, Beryl Bainbridge, Elif Shafak, Margaret Drabble, Ian McEwan, Ted Hughes and P.D. James.

The festival was rebranded as Folkestone Book Festival in 2009, moved from September to November and found a new permanent home in Folkestone’s Quarterhouse at the heart of the town's Creative Quarter.

The 2018 event was billed as the most international ever, with 50 events, and including an Indian night, an American day, and a Turkish night.

As a result of the global COVID-19 pandemic, the Creative Folkestone Book Festival was postponed in 2020 and replaced with Autumn Reads, a four-day festival inspired by the diaries of filmmaker Derek Jarman following the acquisition of Jarman’s Prospect Cottage at nearby Dungeness by the Art Fund.

Dates for the 2021 Book Festival were announced in March 2021 after a year's hiatus as a result of the pandemic. Returning to the 2019 Book Festival theme and title of "The Shape of Things to Come" and inspired by the ideas and thoughts of former Folkestone resident, H. G. Wells, those confirmed to take part include founder of the Everyday Sexism website, Laura Bates, Luke Harding, David Lammy, Nick Bryant and Natalie Haynes. The 2021 Festival will also feature a headline event, Beckett in Folkestone, an immersive multimedia experience celebrating Samuel Beckett’s connections with Folkestone.

Past festival curator/directors
2002-2008 – Saga Magazine's editor, Emma Soames, and then by its contributing editor, Camilla Swift.
2009-2011 – Roberta Spicer: Festivals and Programming Manager.
2012-2018 – Geraldine D’Amico
2019-present - Seán Doran and Liam Browne, a duo who partner under the banner DoranBrowne, which runs the Arts Over Borders programme in Ireland. The theme of ‘The Shape Of Things To Come’ was inspired by author, H G Wells, who was a Folkestone resident for 13 years.

Venues 

Initially located in the Metropole Arts Centre it began to attract larger audiences by using the Saga Pavilion and The Grand as its main venues from 2002. The Grand, the Lanterns and the Leas Club have also been used as venues. The Festival has been based at Quarterhouse in the heart of Folkestone’s Creative Quarter as its main venue since 2009, although other venues across Folkestone and Romney Marsh continue to be used.

Prizes and sponsorship 
Saga sponsored the Festival from 2002 up until 2006 and has funded prizes including The Saga Prize for Wit and Humour (for writers over 50 years old, with a £20,000 prize). Principal sponsor for the 2021 Creative Folkestone Book Festival is the independent news discovery platform, News Now, with additional support provided by the Roger De Haan Charitable Trust, Arts Council England, Folkestone & Hythe District Council, Kent County Council, the EU Interreg North Sea Region Cupido programme and educational partners, Canterbury Christ Church University.

References 

Folkestone
Literary festivals in England